Leucadendron levisanus, commonly known as the Cape flats conebush, is a flower-bearing shrub that belongs to the genus Leucadendron and forms part of the fynbos. The plant is native to the Western Cape, where it occurs in the Cape Flats from Vishoek to Eerste River and Mamre.

Fire destroys the plant but the seeds survive. The seeds are stored in a toll on the female plant and are released where they fall to the ground and are possibly spread by the wind. The plant is unisexual and there are male and female plants. Insects do the pollination.

Gallery

References 

 http://redlist.sanbi.org/species.php?species=794-75
 http://pza.sanbi.org/leucadendron-levisanus
 http://biodiversityexplorer.info/plants/proteaceae/leucadendron_levisanus.htm
 https://www.proteaatlas.org.za/conebu9.htm

levisanus
Taxa named by Peter Jonas Bergius
Plants described in 1766
Flora of the Cape Provinces